Duronia is a comune (municipality) in the Province of Campobasso in the Italian region Molise, located about  northwest of Campobasso.

Duronia borders the following municipalities: Bagnoli del Trigno, Civitanova del Sannio, Frosolone, Molise, Pietracupa, Torella del Sannio.

Demographic evolution

References

Cities and towns in Molise